The Men's triple jump event  at the 2004 IAAF World Indoor Championships was held on March 5–7.

Medalists

Results

Qualification
Qualifying performance 16.95 (Q) or 8 best performers (q) advanced to the final.

Final

References
Results

Triple
Triple jump at the World Athletics Indoor Championships